Trevor Poole (born 23 April 1964) is a former Australian rules football player who played in the VFL/AFL between 1983 and 1989 for the Richmond Football Club and then from 1990 until 1993 for the Geelong Football Club.

References 
 Hogan P: The Tigers Of Old, Richmond FC, Melbourne 1996

External links
 
 

Richmond Football Club players
Geelong Football Club players
Jack Dyer Medal winners
Australian rules footballers from Victoria (Australia)
Living people
1964 births
Victorian State of Origin players